Sydney Allen Robinson (13 August 1905 – 10 April 1978) was a British trade unionist.

Robinson grew up in Clophill in Northamptonshire before becoming a shoemaker.  He joined the National Union of Boot and Shoe Operatives (NUBSO), and became a full-time officer in 1939, then national organiser in 1947, and Assistant General Secretary in 1949.

In 1957, Robinson was elected as General President of NUBSO, and he won a place on the General Council of the Trades Union Congress (TUC) two years later.  In 1966, he was appointed to the Monopolies and Mergers Commission, and this became his main focus after his retirement from his trade union posts in 1970.  In 1972, he was also appointed to the TUC-CBI Conciliation Panel, and he remained active until his death in 1978 aged 72.

References

1905 births
1978 deaths
General Presidents of the National Union of Boot and Shoe Operatives
Members of the General Council of the Trades Union Congress
Shoemakers
People from Northamptonshire